Brussels cheese is made from cow's milk and is considered a table cheese that is used for spreading and snacks.  In texture it is smooth, with its taste being sharp and citrusy, with strong and salty bite. The cheese is regularly washed and dried over a period of at least three months, and is shaped into rounds or tubs.

See also
 List of cheeses

External links
 Cookipedia

Belgian cheeses
Cow's-milk cheeses